Thie is a surname. Notable people with the surname include:

James Thie (born 1978), Welsh middle-distance runner
Ton Thie (1944–2021), Dutch footballer

See also
Thiel (surname)
Thiem
Thies (name)